Saros cycle series 127 for lunar eclipses occurs at the moon's descending node, repeats every 18 years 11 and 1/3 days. It contains 72 events. Solar saros 134 interleaves with this lunar saros with an event occurring every 9 years 5 days alternating between each saros series. It consisted with 10 penumbral eclipses, 21 partial eclipses, 11 total eclipses, 21 partial eclipses, and ends with 8 penumbral eclipses.

Summary 
Lunar saros series 127, repeating every 18 years and 11 days, has a total of 72 lunar eclipse events including 54 umbral lunar eclipses (38 partial lunar eclipses and 16 total lunar eclipses). Solar Saros 134 interleaves with this lunar saros with an event occurring every 9 years 5 days alternating between each saros series.

List

See also 
 List of lunar eclipses
 List of Saros series for lunar eclipses

Notes

External links 
 www.hermit.org: Saros 127

Lunar saros series